EuroPharma is a multinational pharmaceutical company based in Germany.

References

Pharmaceutical companies of Germany